Ajit Pandey (10 March 1937 – 13 June 2013) was an Indian singer and politician.

Life

Born in 1937 in Lalgola, Murshidabad, Pandey became involved in both music and politics from an early age. During his career, he recorded over 30 albums, winning international awards from Russia, Bangladesh and Vietnam. He also served as a Member of the Legislative Assembly, representing the constituency of Bowbazar. He died of a heart attack in Kolkata at the age of 76.

References

West Bengal MLAs 1996–2001
People from Murshidabad district
1938 births
2013 deaths
20th-century Indian singers
Singers from West Bengal
20th-century Indian male singers